Alessio di Savino (born May 22, 1984) is an Italian former amateur boxer. He competed at the 2008 Summer Olympics, the 2009 World Championships and three editions of the European Championships (2008, 2010 and 2013).

At the 2008 Olympics, he lost his debut to Raynell Williams in the men's featherweight division (– 57 kg).

External links
 Data
 

Living people
1984 births
Italian male boxers
Featherweight boxers
Olympic boxers of Italy
Boxers at the 2008 Summer Olympics
Mediterranean Games bronze medalists for Italy
Mediterranean Games medalists in boxing
Competitors at the 2009 Mediterranean Games
Boxers from Rome
21st-century Italian people